Travis Carroll (born October 26, 1978) is former American football player who played as an outside linebacker for Florida, the 2002 New Orleans Saints and the 2003 Houston Texans.

References 

New Orleans Saints players
Houston Texans players
Living people
Florida Gators football players
1978 births
Players of American football from Jacksonville, Florida
American football linebackers
Alabama Crimson Tide football players